The 1940 Utah Redskins football team, also commonly known as the Utah Utes, was an American football team that represented the University of Utah as a member of the Mountain States Conference (MSC) during the 1940 college football season. In their 16th season under head coach Ike Armstrong, the Redskins compiled an overall record of 7–2 record with mark of 5–1 in conference play, won the MSC title, and outscored all opponents by a total of 169 to 87.

Rex Geary was the team captain. Four Utah players received recognition on the 1940 All-Mountain States football team: end Carlos Soffe; tackle Floyd Spendlove; guard Rex Geary; and halfback Izzy Spector.

Utah's season opener against Santa Clara was part of the first-ever major college football doubleheader. The event at Kezar Stadium in San Francisco also featured the future Rose Bowl champions, the Stanford "Wow Boys", defeating San Francisco, 27—0.

Schedule

References

Utah
Utah Utes football seasons
Mountain States Conference football champion seasons
Utah Redskins football